Frank Walker is a Canadian electronic musician and DJ. He is most noted for his single "Only When It Rains", a collaboration with Astrid S which was a Juno Award nominee for Dance Recording of the Year at the Juno Awards of 2020.

Early life 
The son of Canadian business executives Donald J. Walker and Belinda Stronach, he was groomed by his family for a career with the family company, Magna International, and began to pursue music as a hobby while studying business at Wilfrid Laurier University.

Career 
Following his graduation he decided to pursue music instead of stepping directly into a job with Magna, and released his debut EP Nocturnal in 2016. He followed up with the EP 24 in 2017.

The singles "Heartbreak Back", with Riley Biederer on vocals, and "Footprints", with Callum Stewart, followed in 2018, and "Only When It Rains" was released in 2019.

Discography

Extended plays

Singles

References

Canadian electronic musicians
Canadian DJs
University of Western Ontario alumni
Musicians from Toronto
Living people
Year of birth missing (living people)
Electronic dance music DJs